Antal Spányi (born 13 November 1950) is a Hungarian prelate of the Catholic Church, being the bishop of Székesfehérvár since 2004. He was previously the auxiliary bishop of Esztergom–Budapest and titular bishop of Tharros.

References

1950 births
Living people
21st-century Roman Catholic bishops in Hungary
Clergy from Budapest